Ila Mitra (18 October 1925 – 13 October 2002) was a communist and peasants movement organizer of the Indian subcontinent, especially in East Bengal (now Bangladesh).

Early life and education

Mitra's ancestors were from Bagutia village in the present-day Jhenaidah District. She was born on 18 October 1925 in Kolkata. She completed her IA and BA examinations from Bethune College in Calcutta in 1942 and 1944 respectively.

Ila Mitra First 2 Student
Late. Mst.Rahima Begam
Mst.Hira Begam

Leading role in peasant uprising
Mitra was the leader of peasants and indigenous Santhals in greater Rajshahi region, currently in the district of Chapai Nawabganj, and was often referred to by them as RaniMa (Queen mother). She organized a peasant-santhal uprising in Nachole Upazila, Chapai Nawabganj on 5 January 1950, but the uprising was thwarted by the police and Ansar Bahini. Mitra was arrested by the police while trying to escape. She was detained at the Nachole police station for four days, and during the detention, she was repeatedly gang-raped and tortured by the policemen. Then she was sent to the Rajshahi Central jail on 21 January 1950, where she was reportedly tortured for not accepting her involvement in the rebellion. After a trial for treason, Mitra was sentenced to life imprisonment.

Later life

Partly due to the torture, Mitra fell very sick in jail. In 1954, the United Front government of Pakistan paroled her and sent her to Kolkata for treatment. As she was a Hindu and a Communist activist, to avoid persecution, she did not return to Pakistan and stayed the rest of her life in India. She also participated in mobilizing public opinion and support during the Bangladesh Liberation War of 1971.

She was elected to the West Bengal Legislative Assembly for Maniktala constituency during 1962–1971 and 1972–1977.

She played part in stopping riot against Muslims in West Bengal in 1965.

Mitra died in Kolkata on 13 October 2002.

Awards
Soviet Land Neheru for literary translation work
Tamra Patra from the government of India.

References

Further reading

1925 births
2002 deaths
University of Calcutta alumni
Indian women activists
Politicians from Kolkata
Communist Party of India politicians from West Bengal
Women in West Bengal politics
20th-century Indian women politicians
20th-century Indian politicians
Indian revolutionaries
Indian anti-war activists
Adivasi activists
Indian social reformers
Adivasi women
People from Chapai Nawabganj district
Female politicians of the Communist Party of India
Indian activists
Activists from West Bengal